Zambia made its Paralympic Games debut at the 1996 Summer Paralympics in Atlanta, with a single athlete (Lango Sinkamba) competing in men's track and field. In 2000, Zambia had two representatives, once more in track and field. The country was absent from the 2004 Games, but sent one representative in 2008.

Zambian athletes have only ever competed in track and field, and have never won a Paralympic medal. Zambia has never participated in the Winter Paralympic Games.

Full results for Zambia at the Paralympics

Medals by Summer Games

See also
 Zambia at the Olympics

References